Carly Simon is the debut studio album by American singer-songwriter Carly Simon, released by Elektra Records, on February 9, 1971. 

The album was produced by Eddie Kramer, who had previously worked with Joe Cocker and Jimi Hendrix, and included Simon's first Top 10 hit, "That's the Way I've Always Heard It Should Be", which earned her a nomination for the Grammy Award for Best Female Pop Vocal Performance in 1972. A somber ballad centered on a woman pondering marriage with a sense of both inevitability and entrapment; the song was written by Simon and frequent collaborator Jacob Brackman. The album also earned Simon the Grammy Award for Best New Artist at the same ceremony.

The album features material written by Simon, with additional writing by Brackman, Kramer, and Freddy Gardner, as well as covers of songs by Mark Klingman and Buzzy Linhart.

Reception

The album was mostly well received by music critics upon release. Timothy Crouse, writing in Rolling Stone, stated "Carly's voice perfectly matches her material" and her "superbly controlled voice is complemented by deft arrangements." Robert Christgau, writing for The Village Voice, was less impressed; "I suppose it makes sense not only for the privileged to inflict their sensibilities on us, but for many of us to dig it." In more recent years, William Ruhlmann, writing for AllMusic, rated the album 3-stars-out-of-5, and listed the tracks "That's the Way I've Always Heard It Should Be" and "Dan, My Fling" as stand-outs.

In a retrospective assessment, music scholar Kim Simpson deemed "That's the Way I've Always Heard It Should Be" an "early soft rock masterpiece."

Simon stated in the Ask Carly section on her website that "Reunions" was her mother's—Andrea Simon—favorite song of hers.

Awards

Track listing
Credits adapted from the album's liner notes.

Personnel

Musicians

Production
 Producer – Eddie Kramer
 Engineered and Mixed by Eddie Kramer and Dave Palmer
 Art Direction and Design – Robert L. Heimall
 Cover Photography and Poster – Peter Simon
 Back Cover Photography –  Joel Brodsky

Charts
Album – Billboard (United States)

Album – International

Singles – Billboard (United States)

References

External links
Carly Simon's Official Website

1971 debut albums
Carly Simon albums
Elektra Records albums
Albums produced by Eddie Kramer
Albums recorded at Electric Lady Studios
Albums with cover art by Joel Brodsky